Marshall's iora (Aegithina nigrolutea), also known as the white-tailed iora, is a songbird in the genus Aegithina found in parts of India and Sri Lanka.

Distribution and identification
The status of the species has been debated and has only recently been given full species status. Earlier suggestions have been that it was a clinal variant of the common iora Aegithina tiphia.

The diagnostic features of the species are the short wing and tail; white edging to tertials converging broadly at the tip, versus tertial tips black to only narrowly white in tiphia and a smaller and shorter bill than tiphia from any part of India. The vocalizations are also different. The species is best known from northwestern India, however only a few verified specimen records exist from southern India. It is now also known from Sri Lanka.

There are several races of the common iora that may appear similar to this species:
 
 
Salim Ali collected a specimen in the Biligirirangan Hills which was commented upon by Hugh Whistler:

Whistler's comments have been subsequently debated and Daniel Marien notes that the southern boundary of the species is not well understood and further notes that the Biligirirangans specimen commented upon by Whistler was identified positively by Biswamoy Biswas as a nigrolutea.

Adult females of both species are entirely green above (except for a gray and white tail in nigrolutea) and yellow (dull in winter, brighter in spring) below. The juvenal and first-winter plumages in both sexes of both species are similar to their adult female plumages. First-year birds are best recognized by the possession of more pointed and somewhat narrower tail feathers.

Walter Koelz collected two adult specimens of the species at Salem and the distribution range of the species is believed to overlap significantly with that of A. tiphia.

Habits
The species is believed to have a courtship display not unlike that of the common iora. It breeds from June to August and nests low in a bush. It is presumed to be resident but little is known.

References

External links
 Photographs from the Oriental Bird Club collection

Aegithina
Birds of India
Birds of Sri Lanka
Birds described in 1876